The 2010 UEFA Women's Champions League Final was held at Coliseum Alfonso Pérez in Getafe, Spain, on 20 May 2010. It was the first final of the competition after the rebranding from Women's Cup to the Champions League. The final saw Turbine Potsdam beat Lyon 7–6 on penalties after a 0-0 draw after extra time.

Route to final

Final

References

2010
Uefa Women's Champions League Final
International club association football competitions hosted by Spain
Uefa
Sport in Getafe
UEFA
May 2010 sports events in Europe
European Cup Women's Final 2010
UEFA Women's Champions League Final 2010